Krasnogliny  is a village in the administrative district of Gmina Ryki, within Ryki County, Lublin Voivodeship, in eastern Poland.

The village has a population of 241.

References

Krasnogliny